The Platyproteum are a genus of parasitic alveolates in the phylum Apicomplexa. Species in this genus infect marine invertebrates.

Taxonomy

This genus was created in 2009 by Sonja Reuckert and Brian Leander.

There is one species in this genus - Platyproteum vivax. This species was moved from the genus Selenidium.

It appears to be related to Filipodium phascolosomae.

Description

This parasite is tape like.

Life cycle

The parasite infects the gastrointestinal tract and is presumably transmitted by the orofaecal route but the details of this mechanism are presently unknown.

References

Conoidasida
Apicomplexa genera